St. Louis or Saint-Louis could refer to several transportation facilities:

 Saint-Louis station, the main train station in Saint-Louis, Haut-Rhin, France
 Gateway Transportation Center, the main train station in St. Louis, Missouri, USA
 Union Station (St. Louis), a disused train station St. Louis, Missouri, USA